The National Gang Intelligence Center (NGIC) is an agency of the US Department of Justice established by the FBI upon order of Congress in 2005.
The NGIC is a multi-agency effort that integrates the gang intelligence assets of federal, state, and local law enforcement entities to serve as a centralized intelligence resource for gang information and analytical support.

See also 
Gangs in the United States
List of gangs in the United States
National Drug Intelligence Center (DEA)

References

External links
National Gang Intelligence Center

United States Department of Justice agencies
Federal law enforcement agencies of the United States
United States intelligence agencies
2005 establishments in the United States
Gangs in the United States